Karl Lindholm (5 May 1860 – 4 February 1917) was a sailor from the Grand Duchy of Finland, who participated as part of the Russian imperial sailing team at the 1912 Summer Olympics in Nynäshamn, Sweden. He then lived in Saint Petersburg, Russian Empire, and this team of the local yacht club was his team. Lindholm and his six team members took a bronze medal for the Russian Empire in the 10 Metre regatta. Lindholm was born in Turku/Åbo, and he was a Swedish-speaking Finn.

References

Sources
 
 

1860 births
1917 deaths
Male sailors (sport) from the Russian Empire
Finnish people of Swedish descent
People from the Russian Empire of Swedish descent
Sailors at the 1912 Summer Olympics – 10 Metre
Olympic competitors for Russia
Finnish people from the Russian Empire
People from Turku and Pori Province (Grand Duchy of Finland)
Swedish-speaking Finns